SS Corduff, a laden 2345 grt collier in East Coast convoy FS 32, was damaged, though without casualties, in an attack by Stuka divebombers in the Barrow Deep on 11 November 1940.

On the night of 7/8 March 1941 she was torpedoed and sunk by German E-Boat S28 while heading north with a convoy off Cromer. Seven of her crew were lost, and, after drifting for some hours and being hailed by the E-boat captain, the other 14 (including Captain Rees) were found by the Cromer lifeboat H F Bailey. It was the night of the most successful E-Boat raid on East Coast merchant shipping, with six other ships sunk.

Corduff belonged to William Cory & Son Ltd.

References

The National Archives (United Kingdom)
E-Boat Actions ADM 199/670
Nore Cmd WD ADM 199/407
Lloyd's Lists
HMSO Shipping Losses list, 1947
J P Foynes, Battle of the East Coast 1939–1945
V Kuhn, Schnellboote in Einsatz 1939–1945

1923 ships
Colliers
Maritime incidents in November 1940
Maritime incidents in March 1941
Ships built on the River Tyne
World War II shipwrecks in the North Sea